DesignTech Systems is a CAD/CAM/CAE, PLM and engineering services company in India.

DesignTech Systems is headquartered in Pune and has offices in 7 other cities in India in addition to two offices in USA and Canada. The company offers packages in CAD/CAE and Product Life Cycle Management to the SME Segment. DesignTech aims to cross revenues of Rs 1bn by March 2014 and expects to grow that by 100% in the subsequent three years.

Besides CAD/CAM/CAE and PLM sector, DesignTech also offers services for the Healthcare IT segment. The Asclepius Clinic, a hospital information management software produced by the company helps in workflow management and configurations in hospitals. It is widely used by medical practitioners and doctors, helping them do affordable healthcare management. The DesignTech CAD academy, a training vertical of the company is the authorized training and education partner of Siemens India Inc. and Altair Engineering, providing training on all their CAD/CAM/CAE and PLM suites of solutions. It has branches in Pune, Nashik and Hyderabad. Along with their partner Siemens PLM Software, DesignTech has signed an agreement with the Gujarat Government to set up 'Centers of Excellence for Skill Development' in higher education across the state. The company was also a part of Mahindra Scorpio's development team where they worked on complex component development and vehicle integration. Nissan Techno signed DesignTech Systems as their certified implementation partner in 2014 to bring Indian supplier at par with global engineering standard. In 2015, the company was selected as the 10 most promising PLM companies by Silicon India magazine. They also entered into a joint venture with Integrity Tool and Mold, the largest automotive mold, tool and die manufacturing companies in North America in the same year. DesignTech also partnered with Solidscape to launch 3D Printers in India in 2017.

History
Founded in 1998 by Mr. Vikas Khanvelkar, and Mr. Sachin Chougule, it is claimed: "DesignTech is changing the way companies use automation for their various product design processes."
Annual Turnover of Rs. 400 crores.

Awards
 NASSCOM Emerge 50 Award: DesignTech was adjudged amongst the top 50 Emerging Companies from India in 2010 by NASSCOM 
 Siemens awarded DesignTech the Best Channel Partner Award in 2013 
 DesignTech Systems Ltd. has been honored with special recognition and award from NASSCOM Emerge Out Forum.
 Siemens PLM Software 2012 Top India Partner Award: Companies that demonstrate a commitment to providing quality service and consistent growth potential by reselling Siemens PLM Software's technology are awarded the same 
 Channel World Premiere 100 Award: DesignTech was recognized amongst the top 100 companies 
 Maharashtra State IT Award:  DesignTech was honored with Maharashtra State IT award for Engineering Services in 2010

Events
 PCCOE (Pimpri Chinchwad College of Engineering)& DesignTech CAD Academy hosted a National Level technical symposium "Techlligent 2014" 
 DesignTech CAD Academy celebrated "3D Diwali" where students had to develop 3D Models of Diwali related artifacts using some of the most advanced CAD software solutions.

References

External links

Privately held companies of India
Companies established in 1998
Engineering companies of India
1998 establishments in Maharashtra